Helltaker is a freeware indie puzzle-adventure game with dating-sim elements designed by Polish developer Łukasz Piskorz, also known as vanripper. It was released in May 2020 for Microsoft Windows, macOS, and Linux, and is described as "a short game about sharply dressed demon girls."

Gameplay
The player proceeds through a series of puzzle stages with the end goal of reaching a demon girl, answering her question appropriately, and incorporating her into the player's demon harem. Each puzzle stage involves pushing stones and skeleton soldiers around a two-dimensional top-down grid akin to Sokoban while keeping within a set turn limit, while also avoiding spike traps and collecting key items. After reaching the goal, the demon girl for that particular stage will ask a question in which the player must infer the correct answer based on her personality, and an incorrect answer may result in a bad ending such as death, taking the player back to the beginning of the stage.

The final boss level (featuring the demon Judgement, the High Prosecutor) includes phased bullet-hell-like mechanics with chains across the screen.

Plot
Narrated by Beelzebub, the plot follows the player character, known only as "The Helltaker," in his descent to hell to acquire a harem of demons. As the game progresses, the harem becomes  increasingly dysfunctional, with the Helltaker admitting that all he can offer is "coffee, turn based strategies and chocolate pancakes." The final level, "Epilogue," shows the harem on earth, with one of two endings; the "Regular Ending" in which the Helltaker opens the front door of the house to police outside, and the "Abysstaker Ending" where the Helltaker opens a portal utilizing three stone tablets, which have a set of moves inscribed on each of them that the player must start to perform in the middle of the carpet located in the Helltaker's house in the epilogue. The player can collect them in three of the stages during the main game.

Vanripper has posted comics on his Twitter account that canonically take place before the "Epilogue" as well as some that take place after the "Abysstaker Ending". A level pack, called Examtaker, featuring harder stages and a continuation of one of the comic arcs was released in 2021 to celebrate the game's one year anniversary.

Development

Łukasz Piskorz, known on Twitter as "vanripper", developed the entirety of the game by himself over an estimated one-year period and was the game's artistic director. According to Piskorz, Helltaker is somewhat reminiscent of the Leisure Suit Larry video game series, as the main characters of both games have characteristics reminiscent of each other.

The game can be played for free and includes an art book and the recipe for the pancakes, which can also be bought separately as a means of supporting the developer.

Although the video game is only officially available in English, Piskorz has supported the translations made by the community, explaining how to make them and making one in Polish himself.

An additional chapter was added to the game on May 11, 2021, in celebration of the game's first anniversary.

On July 1, 2020, a fanmade port for the Nintendo Switch, authorized by Piskorz, was released via GitHub. On September 7 of that same year, it was followed by a fanmade port for the PlayStation Vita.

References

2020 video games
Adventure games
Dating sims
Indie video games
Linux games
MacOS games
Puzzle video games
Video games set in hell
Video games about demons
Video games developed in Poland
Windows games